The Ransome-Kuti family is a Nigerian Yoruba political family noted for its simultaneous contributions to art, religion, education and medicine. It belongs to the Nigerian bourgeoisie, and also has historic links to the Nigerian chieftaincy system.

History
The first member to bear the name Ransome, the Reverend Josiah Jesse "J.J." Ransome-Kuti, adopted it in honour of the Anglican missionary who had first converted his family to Christianity. He followed his father Likoye Kuti — an Egba griot — into the musical vocation, and wrote a series of popular hymns in the Yoruba language while serving as an Anglican cleric.

The descendants of J.J.'s son, the Reverend Israel Oludotun Ransome-Kuti, and Chief Funmilayo Ransome-Kuti include a health minister (who had also served as a university professor), a political activist (who would himself later be adopted as an Amnesty International prisoner of conscience), and six further musicians (including one who founded and led a political party and three Grammy Award nominees).

The Ransome-Kutis have been known to form marital unions with other families of the Yoruba elite: the branch descended from Chief Funmilayo Ransome-Kuti is a sept of the aristocratic Jibolu-Taiwo family of Egbaland by virtue of its descent from her, while the one descended from the Reverend Samuel Ayodele Soyinka, the husband of Grace Eniola Jenkins-Harrison, is related to the royal family of Isara-Remo through him.

Family tree

Olasu (c. 1750–c. 1820)
Jamo (c.1785–c.1850) m. Orukoloku (c.1795–c.1870)
Likoye Kuti (c.1820–c.1863) m. Anne Ekidan Efupeyin (c. 1830–July 1877)
Eruwe Lousia Kuti (c.1857–19??)
Josiah Jesse Ransome-Kuti (1855–1930), clergyman and the first person to use the double-barrelled family name, m. Bertha Erinade Anny Olubi (1862–1934)
Josiah Oluyinka Ransome Kuti (1883–c.1960)
Anne Lape Iyabode Ransome-Kuti (1885–c.1960)
Grace Eniola Jenkins-Harrison (1908–1983) (Grace Eniola Soyinka) m. Samuel Ayodele Soyinka
Akinwande Oluwole Babatunde Soyinka (1934) (Wole Soyinka), writer, amongst others
Olufela Daniel Ransome-Kuti (1887–1887)
 Israel Oludotun Ransome-Kuti (1891–1955), clergyman, m. Frances Abigail Olufunmilayo Thomas (1900–1978) (Funmilayo Ransome-Kuti), political activist
Olikoye Ransome-Kuti (1927–2003), doctor
Olufela Olusegun Oludotun Ransome-Kuti (1938–1997) (Fela Kuti), musician, m. Remilekun Taylor, amongst others
 Yeni Anikulapo Kuti (b. 1961), dancer, m. Femi Segun
 Rolari Segun (b. 1988)
 Olufela Olufemi Anikulapo Kuti, (b. 1962) (Femi Kuti), musician, m. Funke Kuti, dancer/music manager (now divorced)
 Omorinmade Anikulapo Kuti, (b. 1995) (Made Kuti), musician
 Sola Anikulapo Kuti, (1963–1997), dancer
 Kunle Anikulapo Kuti, (b. circa 1971), folk singer, m . Olufunmilayo Hastrup (b. 1964)
 Omosalewa Anikulapo Kuti, lawyer, m. Fehintola (1958–2006)
 Oluseun Anikulapo Kuti, (b. 1982) (Seun Kuti), musician
 Motunrayo Anikulapo Kuti, (b. 1980), dancer 
Bekolari Ransome-Kuti (1940–2006), (Beko Ransome-Kuti), doctor and political activist 
Enitan Ransome-Kuti, Nigerian Army officer
 Dolupo Ransome-Kuti (1922–2010)
 Frances Kuboye (d. 1997), dentist/jazz singer 
Joshua Oluremi Ransome-Kuti (1894–c. 1970)
Susannah Olubade (1898–1898)
Victoria Susannah Tinuade Ransome-Kuti (1899–1980)
 Azariah Olusegun Orisale Ransome-Kuti (1902–1979)
Yemisi Ransome-Kuti (1947), current chief of the family
 Olusegun Bucknor
 Bola Soyemi
 Oluwaseun Olasupo Soyemi
 Eniola Anuoluwapo Mofoluwaso Soyemi

See also
 Vaughan family

References

Further reading

External links
 The Shrine The unofficial website for Fela Kuti and Afrobeat Music, with biographies of Fela, Femi and Seun Kuti.

 
Yoruba families
Nigerian families
Political families
Musical families
Nigerian noble families